Joseph Teye Tetteh is a Ghanaian politician and also a teacher. He served as a member of parliament for the Kpone-Katamanso constituency in the Greater Accra region of Ghana.

Early life and education 
Tetteh was born on 15 December 1945. He attended Tema Technical Institute where he obtained a certificate in City & Guild in tailoring, He also went to Cuttbus (GDR) where he obtained a Diploma in Social Science.

Politics 
Tetteh was elected during the 1992 Ghanaian parliamentary election as the first member of the fourth republic of Ghana on the ticket of the National Democratic Congress.

In 1996, Afieye Ashong of National Democratic Congress took the seat with 7,901 votes cast which representing 59.50% of the share by defeating George T. Noye of the New Patriotic Party who obtained 2,609 votes which represent 19.60% of the share; Emmanuel Kweku Sagoe of National Convention Party who obtained 562 votes which represent 4.20% of the share and Theophilus Tei Okunor of People's National Convention who obtained 138 votes which represent 1.00% of the share.

Ashong was again elected as member of parliament for the Kpone Katamanso constituency in the 3rd parliament of the 4th Republic of Ghana in the 2000 Ghanaian general elections.

Career 
Joseph Teye Tetteh was the former member of the First Parliament of the Fourth Republic of Ghana for  Kpone-Katamanso from 7 January 1993 to 6 January 1997. He is a teacher.

Personal life 
He is a Christian

References 

1945 births
Ghanaian MPs 1993–1997
People from Greater Accra Region
National Democratic Congress (Ghana) politicians
Ghanaian Christians
Ghanaian educators
Living people